Sabina Zakharova (born 13 March 1992) is a Kazakhstani karateka. She won the silver medal in the women's kumite 55 kg event at the 2014 Asian Games held in Incheon, South Korea. She is also a five-time medalist at the Asian Karate Championships.

Career 

She competed in the women's kumite 55 kg event at the 2018 Asian Games held in Jakarta, Indonesia. She lost her first match against Wen Tzu-yun of Chinese Taipei and she was then eliminated in the repechage by Syakilla Salni of Malaysia.

In June 2021, she competed at the World Olympic Qualification Tournament held in Paris, France hoping to qualify for the 2020 Summer Olympics in Tokyo, Japan. She competed in the 61 kg weight class and she reached the round-robin stage of the tournament where she failed to qualify for the Summer Olympics. In November 2021, she competed in the women's 55 kg event at the World Karate Championships held in Dubai, United Arab Emirates.

Achievements

References

External links 
 

Living people
1992 births
Place of birth missing (living people)
Kazakhstani female karateka
Karateka at the 2014 Asian Games
Karateka at the 2018 Asian Games
Medalists at the 2014 Asian Games
Asian Games medalists in karate
Asian Games silver medalists for Kazakhstan
21st-century Kazakhstani women